Dairy Flat is a northern rural district located 8 km south of Orewa in the North Island of New Zealand and 28 km north of central Auckland. Until the early 1990s most of the district was in dairy farms of 40 to 60 hectares (100 to 150 acres), but with the growth of Auckland City and the extension of the Northern Motorway into the area, these are being gradually overtime subdivided into lifestyle blocks of around 2 to 5 hectares (5 to 12 acres), many of which are grazing sheep, horses, beef cattle or deer. Although it still retains a rural character, it is counted as part of the Auckland urban area in official statistics.

'Dairy Flat' lies within the Rodney ward on State Highway 1 and the former State Highway 17.

There is a small village shopping centre and the Dairy Flat Primary School. A major facility is the North Shore Aerodrome owned and operated by the North Shore Aero Club. In addition to aero club and private aircraft, the field is used by Barrier Air to run a scheduled air service in passenger aircraft to Great Barrier Island, some 40 nautical miles (75 km) offshore of the coast.

Demographics

Dairy Flat had a population of 4,827 at the 2018 New Zealand census, an increase of 399 people (9.0%) since the 2013 census, and an increase of 1,071 people (28.5%) since the 2006 census. There were 1,557 households, comprising 2,403 males and 2,424 females, giving a sex ratio of 0.99 males per female, with 846 people (17.5%) aged under 15 years, 1,017 (21.1%) aged 15 to 29, 2,403 (49.8%) aged 30 to 64, and 561 (11.6%) aged 65 or older.

Ethnicities were 85.0% European/Pākehā, 6.2% Māori, 1.4% Pacific peoples, 12.8% Asian, and 1.9% other ethnicities. People may identify with more than one ethnicity.

The percentage of people born overseas was 32.4, compared with 27.1% nationally.

Although some people chose not to answer the census's question about religious affiliation, 59.4% had no religion, 30.8% were Christian, 0.1% had Māori religious beliefs, 0.4% were Hindu, 0.5% were Muslim, 0.9% were Buddhist and 1.7% had other religions.

Of those at least 15 years old, 1,041 (26.1%) people had a bachelor's or higher degree, and 414 (10.4%) people had no formal qualifications. 1,041 people (26.1%) earned over $70,000 compared to 17.2% nationally. The employment status of those at least 15 was that 2,115 (53.1%) people were employed full-time, 696 (17.5%) were part-time, and 108 (2.7%) were unemployed.

Education

The notable secondary schools that are currently serving Dairy Flat are Orewa College, Westlake Boys High School, Westlake Girls High School, Long Bay College and Rangitoto College.

References

Rodney Local Board Area
Populated places in the Auckland Region